Ashok Captain (born 4 September 1960) is an Indian herpetologist who has authored books and papers on Indian snakes. He was also a competing cyclist from 1977 to 1989.

Eponyms
Captain's wood snake (Xylophis captaini)  and Ashok's bronzeback tree snake (Dendrelaphis ashoki)  have been named after Ashok Captain.

Publications
Works by Ashok Captain include:

References

Further reading
Vogel, Gernot; van Rooijen, Johan (2011). "Contributions to a Review of the Dendrelaphis pictus (Gmelin, 1789) Complex (Serpentes: Colubridae) — 3. The Indian Forms, with the Description of a New Species from the Western Ghats". Journal of Herpetology 45 (1): 100–110. (Dendrelaphis ashoki, new species).

20th-century Indian zoologists
Living people
1960 births